Ayanda Lubelo (born 28 February 1992) is a South African football (soccer) midfielder who plays for Uthongathi in the Premier Soccer League.

References

External links

1992 births
Living people
Association football midfielders
Bidvest Wits F.C. players
University of Pretoria F.C. players
Mpumalanga Black Aces F.C. players
Polokwane City F.C. players
Uthongathi F.C. players
South African Premier Division players
National First Division players
Sportspeople from Durban
South African soccer players